Leucopogon inflexus  is a species of flowering plant in the heath family Ericaceae and is endemic to the south-west of Western Australia. It is an erect, open shrub with more or less glabrous young branchlets, spirally arranged, erect, egg-shaped to more or less round leaves, and white, bell-shaped, densely bearded flowers.

Description

Taxonomy
Leucopogon inflexus was first formally described in 2016 by Michael Hislop in the journal Nuytsia from specimens collected near Eneabba in 2006. The specific epithet (inflexus) means "bent backwards", referring to the leaf tips of dried specimens.

Distribution and habitat
This leucopogon grows in heath and low woodland between Dongara, Eneabba and the Arrino district in the Geraldton Sandplains bioregion of south-western Western Australia.

Conservation status
Leucopogon inflexus is listed as "not threatened" by the Government of Western Australia Department of Biodiversity, Conservation and Attractions.

References

inflexus
Ericales of Australia
Flora of Western Australia
Plants described in 2016